Cornelis Pieter "Cees" Veerman (born 8 March 1949) is a retired Dutch politician of the Christian Democratic Appeal (CDA) party and economist.

Veerman applied at the Rotterdam School of Economics in May 1967 majoring in Economics obtaining a Bachelor of Economics degree in June 1969 working as a student researcher before obtaining a Master of Economics degree in July 1973. Veerman worked as an economics teacher in Delft from October 1971 until January 1976. Veerman served on the Municipal Council of Nieuw-Beijerland from May 1973 until June 1980 and on the Municipal Council of Korendijk from February 1986 until September 1991. Veerman worked as an associate professor of Economics at the Erasmus University Rotterdam from January 1976 until September 1989. Veerman applied at the Wageningen University in April 1979 for a postgraduate education in Economics working as a researcher and got a doctorate as a Doctor of Philosophy in Agricultural economics in August 1983. Veerman worked as a distinguished professor of Agricultural economics at the Tilburg University from September 1989 until July 2002 and as a distinguished professor of Agricultural economics and Public administration at the Erasmus University Rotterdam from May 1990 until August 1997. Veerman also became active in the private sector and public sector and occupied numerous seats as a corporate director and nonprofit director on several boards of directors and supervisory boards (Ernst & Young, LEI Wageningen UR and the General Bank of the Netherlands) and served on several state commissions and councils on behalf of the government (Social and Economic Council). Veerman also served as Chairman of the Education board of the Wageningen University from 1 May 1997 until 22 July 2002.

Biography

Early life
Veerman attended Erasmus University in Rotterdam, then went on to attain a doctorate degree of economic science at Wageningen University in 1983.

After attaining his degree, Veerman taught economics at a secondary school.  In 1989 he taught agricultural business economics and sociology at Tilburg University.  A year later, Veerman became a professor of agribusiness at his alma mater, Erasmus University, then in 1997, became chairman of the board of management at Wageningen University.

Politics
Veerman served as the Minister of Agriculture, Nature and Food Quality for the Netherlands in the third and fourth cabinet Balkenende. He was also President of the EU Council of Agriculture Ministers. Some of the key issues he was focused on include the relationship between agriculture and society (especially combating poverty), the relationship between farming and nature, and reforms for the EU's Common Agricultural Policy (CAP), which includes the feud over European farm aid. He is very influential in international environmental affairs.  He was succeeded by Gerda Verburg on 22 February 2007.

Trivia
he sat as a member on various supervisory boards throughout his career.  Some of these boards include the National Cooperative Council for Agricultural and Horticulture, the board of the Horticultural Auction Association, the DLO Agricultural Economics Research Institute, the Moret, Ernst & Young advisory board, the Nieuw-Beijerland municipal council for the Christian Democratic Alliance (CDA), and the Social and Economic Council.

Decorations

References

External links

Official
  Dr. C.P. (Cees) Veerman Parlement & Politiek

 

1949 births
Living people
Agricultural economists
Christian Democratic Appeal politicians
Christian Historical Union politicians
Academic staff of the Delft University of Technology
Dutch academic administrators
Dutch farmers
Dutch corporate directors
Dutch members of the Dutch Reformed Church
Dutch nonprofit directors
Dutch nonprofit executives
Dutch public administration scholars
Erasmus University Rotterdam alumni
Academic staff of Erasmus University Rotterdam
Members of the Royal Netherlands Academy of Arts and Sciences
Members of the Social and Economic Council
Ministers of Agriculture of the Netherlands
Municipal councillors in South Holland
Officers of the Order of Orange-Nassau
People from Korendijk
Protestant Church Christians from the Netherlands
Academic staff of Tilburg University
Wageningen University and Research alumni
Academic staff of Wageningen University and Research
20th-century Dutch economists
20th-century Dutch educators
20th-century Dutch politicians
21st-century Dutch businesspeople
21st-century Dutch civil servants
21st-century Dutch economists
21st-century Dutch educators
21st-century Dutch politicians